Frank Markham Skipworth (1854 in Castor, Lincolnshire – 1929 in London) was an English portrait painter. He painted also genre and historical subjects.

He studied for two years at the Lincoln School of Art, then under Edward Poynter at the Royal Academy Schools for three years and became a pupil of Adolphe William Bouguereau in Paris.

References

1854 births
1929 deaths
19th-century English painters
English male painters
20th-century English painters
20th-century English male artists
19th-century English male artists
People educated at Caistor Grammar School